"Need You Most (So Sick)" (stylised in all caps) is a song by Australian rapper the Kid Laroi, send to Australian radio on 21 August 2020 as the third single from his debut mixtape F*ck Love (2020).
The song samples "So Sick" by Ne-Yo. "Need You Most (So Sick)" peaked at number 79 on the ARIA charts.

Charts

Certifications

References

2020 songs
2020 singles
The Kid Laroi songs
Songs written by the Kid Laroi
Songs written by Ne-Yo
Columbia Records singles
Sony Music singles